Elections to City of Bradford Metropolitan District Council were held on Thursday, 6 May 1982, with one third of the council to be elected. The council fell to no overall control after the elections.

Election result

This result had the following consequences for the total number of seats on the council after the elections:

Ward results

References

1982 English local elections
1982
1980s in West Yorkshire
May 1982 events in the United Kingdom